The second season of Painted with Raven is set to premiere on November 17, 2022. The cosmetic competition is exclusively available through WOW Presents Plus.

On December 9, 2021, the production company World of Wonder renewed a second season for Painted with Raven. On February 14, 2022, a casting call was open for the second season and ended on March 4. On November 9, 2022, the second season's trailer was revealed with its casting. RuPaul, Randy Barbato, Fenton Bailey, and Tom Campbell, stay as the executive producers for Painted with Raven.

Contestants 
Ages, names, and cities stated are at time of filming.

Notes:

Contestants progress 
Legend:

Episodes

References 

2022 American television seasons
Painted with Raven